Daveed Gartenstein-Ross (born 1976) is an author and the founder and chief executive officer of Valens Global. In addition to his role at Valens Global, Dr. Gartenstein-Ross is a Senior Advisor on Asymmetric Warfare at the Foundation for Defense of Democracies. An internationally-recognized expert on political violence, his work primarily focuses on the development of strategic plans, execution of analytic projects, and instruction at the professional and academic levels. In 2011, Gartenstein-Ross wrote Bin Laden's Legacy: Why We're Still Losing the War on Terror.

Career
After law school Gartenstein-Ross worked as a law clerk on the United States Court of Appeals for the DC Circuit, and was subsequently employed in a New York City law firm.  Following his work as a litigator, Gartenstein-Ross served at Steven Emerson's Investigative Project on Terrorism and started his own counter-terrorism consulting business.  In 2007 he began working as vice president at the Foundation for Defense of Democracies. In 2010, he became a Senior Fellow there. Dr. Gartenstein-Ross has additionally served as a senior advisor to the director of the United States Department of Homeland Security's Office for Community Partnerships, as a fellow with Jigsaw LLC, and as an adjunct assistant professor with Georgetown University's Security Studies Program.

Gartenstein-Ross is the author or volume editor of over twenty-five books and monographs, including From Energy Crisis to Energy Security> and The Afghanistan-Pakistan Theater: Militant Islam, Security and Stability.  His writings on political violence have been published widely, including in Middle East Quarterly, The Atlantic, The Journal of International Security Affairs, The New York Times, The Wall Street Journal Europe, Foreign Policy, The Times of India, and Foreign Affairs.

His consulting work has included live hostage negotiations, work on border security issues, and story development for major media companies. He frequently leads training for the U.S. military and federal, state, and local law enforcement; in 2009 he received a Leader Development and Education for Sustained Peace Support Excellence Award from U.S. Army Central Command for this work.  Gartenstein-Ross has also served as a Subject Matter Expert designing and delivering training for the U.S. State Department's Office of Antiterrorism Assistance, and was recently an expert witness in a successful asylum case where the asylee feared retribution from Somalia's al-Shabaab due to his family's support of the country's transitional federal government.

Gartenstein-Ross co-authored two reports in 2009, Homegrown Terrorists in the U.S. and U.K. and Terrorism in the West 2008. The former is an empirical examination of the radicalization process in 117 homegrown jihadi terrorists that provides a new framework for understanding the impact of religious ideology.  Brian Michael Jenkins described the work as "an important study that adds to our knowledge of terrorist radicalization."  On 13 occasions he has given expert testimony on political violence before Congress, including to the United States Senate Committee on Homeland Security and Governmental Affairs, and the United States House Committee on Financial Services.

Bin Laden's Legacy
In 2011, Gartenstein-Ross wrote Bin Laden's Legacy: Why We're Still Losing the War on Terror. The central argument of the book is that in the decade since 9/11, the U.S. has grown weaker: It has been bogged down by costly wars in Iraq and Afghanistan. Peter Bergensaid that "Daveed Gartenstein-Ross has written an analytically sharp, fluidly written account of al Qaeda and its affiliates in the post-bin Laden era. It makes for sobering and essential reading."  Clark Kent Ervin, said "this book is an important contribution to the post-bin Laden debate about how to fight terrorism smarter and cheaper at a time of constraints on America's power and purse."
 
While the book was widely received with positive reviews, there have been criticism of the feasibility of some of the policy prescriptions found in the final chapter.

Strategic Framework for Countering Terrorism and Targeted Violence
Dr. Gartenstein-Ross led Valens Global’s efforts to support the drafting, threat assessment, and crafting of priority actions for the United States Department of Homeland Security’s Strategic Framework for Countering Terrorism and Targeted Violence, which was publicly released in September 2019 and has subsequently guided DHS’s approach to confronting terrorism and other forms of sub-state violence. The document was ordered by Acting Secretary of Homeland Security Kevin McAleenan, and was one of the first government reports to assess the domestic terror threat as comparable to the threat posed by foreign terrorism.

References

External links
Official website

American lawyers
20th-century American Jews
Living people

1976 births
Experts on terrorism
21st-century American Jews
Wake Forest University alumni
New York University School of Law alumni
Catholic University of America alumni